Acoustic tags are small sound-emitting devices that allow the detection and/or remote tracking of organisms in aquatic ecosystems.  Acoustic tags are commonly used to monitor the behavior of fish. Studies can be conducted in lakes, rivers, tributaries, estuaries or at sea.  Acoustic tag technology allows researchers to obtain locational data of tagged fish: depending on tag and receiver array configurations, researchers can receive simple presence/absence data, 2D positional data, or even 3D fish tracks in real-time with sub-meter resolutions.

Acoustic tags allow researchers to:
 Conduct Survival Studies
 Monitor  Migration/Passage/Trajectory
 Track Behavior in Two or Three Dimensions (2D or 3D)
 Measure Bypass Effectiveness at Dams and other Passages
 Observe Predator/Prey Dynamics 
 Serveil movement and activity

Sampling

Acoustic Tags transmit a signal made up of acoustic pulses or "pings" that sends location information about the tagged organism to the hydrophone receiver.  By tying the received acoustic signature to the known type of programmed signal code, the specific tagged individual is identified.  The transmitted signal can propagate up to 1 km (in freshwater). Receivers can be actively held by a researcher ("Active Tracking") or affixed to specific locations ("Passive Tracking"). Arrays of receivers can allow the triangulation of tagged individuals over many kilometers. Acoustic tags can have very long battery life - some tags last up to four years .

Tags

Acoustic Tags are produced in many different shapes and sizes depending on the type of species being studied, or the type of environment in which the study is conducted.  Sound parameters such as frequency and modulation method are chosen for optimal detectability, and signal level.  For oceanic environments, frequencies less than 100 kHz range are often used, while frequencies of several hundreds of kilohertz are more common in for studies in rivers and lakes.

A typical Acoustic Tag consists of a piezoceramic transducer, drive/timing electronics, and a battery power source .  Cylindrical or “tube” transducers are often used, which have metalization on the inner and outer walls of the structure.  In normal operation, an alternating current (AC) electrical signal generated by the drive/timing electronics is impressed across the two metalization layers.  This voltage creates stress in the material, which in turn cause the transducer to emit an acoustic signal or “ping”, which emanates outward from the surface of the tube.  An acoustic “ping” can be detected by specialized receivers, and processed using advanced signal processing techniques to determine if a fish swimming into the reception area carries a specific acoustic tag.

Acoustic Tags are distinguished from other types of devices such as radio tags, or passive inductive transponder (PIT) tags, in that they can work in either salt or freshwater (RF and PIT tags perform poorly in saltwater) and do not depend on steering the fish in a particular path (PIT tags require the fish to be routed through a restricted sensing area).

Several different types of methods are used to attach the tag to an organism. In fish, tags are frequently embedded into the individual by cutting a small incision in the abdominal cavity of the fish (surgical implantation), or put down the gullet to embed the Acoustic Tag in the stomach (gastric implantation). External attachment using adhesive compounds is typically not used for fish as scale fluids do not allow for any successful attachment to scale tissue. In other organisms tags are attached with heavy duty glues.

Receivers

By determining the sound's time of arrival at each hydrophone, the 3D position of the fish can be calculated.  The hydrophone receiver picks up the sound signal and converts it to data that researchers use to plot the resulting tag positions in three dimensions, in real-time.  Using a post processing software, such as MarkTags, takes that data and delivers the result, the 3D track.

Applications

Rivers

Dams
At present, acoustic tags are most commonly used to monitor fish approaching diversion and guidance structures at hydropower dams.  This allows hydropowered dam facilities, public utility districts, and municipalities to evaluate specific migration pathways used by the fish (most often salmon smolts), identify where fish mortality occurs and assess fish behavior in relation to hydrodynamic conditions and/or any other environmental parameters.  Ultimately, working to improve bypass effectiveness and protect fish populations, Acoustic Tag Tracking Systems are a significant breakthrough in the preservation of migrating salmon populations.  For an example of Acoustic Tag Tracking Systems at work on the Columbia River, see Grant County's most recent application or Chelan County's most recent application.

Acoustic tags  have been employed to help public utility agencies, private firms, and state and federal agencies meet fisheries regulations as defined by the Federal Regulations and Oversight of Energy known as FERC.

Lakes

Ocean

Nearshore Ecosystem

Offshore Ecosystem

See also
 Animal migration tracking
 Data storage tag
 GIS and aquatic science
 Pop-up satellite archival tag

References
	

 A Multiple-Release Model to Estimate Route-Specific and Dam Passage Survival at a Hydroelectric Project
 Movement and Habitat Use of Chinook Salmon Smolts, Northern Pikeminnow, and Smallmouth Bass Near the SR 520 Bridge
 Basin-wide Monitoring of Salmon Smolts at US Dams
 Categorising Salmon Migration Behaviour Using Characteristics of Split-beam Acoustic Data
 Basin-Wide Monitoring of Acoustically Tagged Salmon Smolts at Hydropower Dams in the Mid-Columbia River Basin, USA
 Correcting Bias in Survival Estimation Resulting From Tag Failure in Acoustic and Radiotelemetry Studies 
 Comparison of Acoustic and PIT Tagged Juvenile Chinook, Steelhead and Sockeye Salmon (Oncorhynchus, spp.) Passing Dams on the Columbia River, USA 
 A Method for Estimating the "Position Accuracy" of Fish Tags 
 Monitoring the Three-Dimensional Behavior of Acoustically Tagged Salmon Approaching Hydropower Dams in the Pacific Northwest 
 Monitoring the Behavior of Acoustically Tagged Chinook and Steelhead Smolts Approaching Rocky Reach Dam on the Columbia River 
  Additional Publications

Ichthyology
Fisheries science
Sound
Acoustics